The yellowish-streaked honeyeater or olive-streaked honeyeater (Ptiloprora meekiana) is a species of bird in the family Meliphagidae.
It is found in New Guinea.
Its natural habitat is subtropical or tropical moist montane forests.

References

yellowish-streaked honeyeater
Birds of New Guinea
yellowish-streaked honeyeater
Taxonomy articles created by Polbot